Valentín Nicolás Viola (born 28 August 1991) is an Argentine football player who plays for Barracas Central.

Career

Racing Club
Valentín came through the Racing Club youth development system, and made his debut for Racing's first team in a friendly match against El Porvenir in January 2010. His first official match occurred on 3 September 2010 during Apertura 2010, in a match against Colón; he scored his first official goal on 7 May 2011 in the 2-1 win against Arsenal de Sarandí, when he came on as a substitute in the 80th minute, replacing Gabriel Hauche, and scored one minute later. Valentín had already scored for Racing first team, when he scored a header against Godoy Cruz at Copa Ciudad de Mendonza on 27 January 2011.

Sporting
On late July 2012, despite interest from other clubs, such as Parma, Atlético Madrid and Benfica, he was transferred to Sporting.

References

External links
 
 
  
 

1991 births
Living people
Argentine footballers
Argentine expatriate footballers
Association football forwards
Argentine Primera División players
Primeira Liga players
Süper Lig players
Belgian Pro League players
Categoría Primera A players
Racing Club de Avellaneda footballers
Sporting CP footballers
Sporting CP B players
Kardemir Karabükspor footballers
Apollon Limassol FC players
Royal Excel Mouscron players
Independiente Medellín footballers
San Lorenzo de Almagro footballers
San Martín de Tucumán footballers
Nueva Chicago footballers
Club Agropecuario Argentino players
Barracas Central players
Argentine expatriate sportspeople in Portugal
Argentine expatriate sportspeople in Belgium
Expatriate footballers in Portugal
Expatriate footballers in Belgium
Sportspeople from Buenos Aires Province
Argentine people of Italian descent